This is a list of Dutch television related events from 2002.

Events
27 April - Valerie Dwarkasing, performing as Alicia Keys, wins the eighteenth and final series of Soundmixshow.
1 November - Idols, the Dutch version of Pop Idol debuts on RTL 4.
23 December - Jeanette Godefroy wins the fourth series of Big Brother.

Debuts
1 November - Idols (2002-2008, 2016–present)

Television shows

1950s
NOS Journaal (1956–present)

1970s
Sesamstraat (1976–present)

1980s
Jeugdjournaal (1981–present)
Het Klokhuis (1988–present)

1990s
Goede tijden, slechte tijden (1990–present)
Big Brother (1999-2006)
De Club van Sinterklaas (1999-2009)

Ending this year
Soundmixshow (1985-2002)
Monte Carlo (1998-2002)

Births

Deaths

See also
2002 in the Netherlands